Nightworld is the seventh and final volume in a series of novels known as The Adversary Cycle written by American author F. Paul Wilson. First published in 1992 by New English Library in England (May) and Dark Harvest in US (August). Nightworld completes The Adversary Cycle, which consists of seven books: The Keep, The Tomb, The Touch, Reborn, Reprisal, Signalz, and Nightworld.

Nightworld was heavily revised for its reprinting in 2012 to include the events that happened in the subsequently written novels in the Repairman Jack series.

Plot
Rasalom returns in reincarnated form to transform the Earth into unrelenting hell. Rasalom is shortening the daylight hours and letting loose a plague of ever-more-fearsome flesh-eating monsters that prey on the world's populace during the ever-lengthening nights. Whole communities turn on one another; riots break out over food; gangs wage war on the public; and Rasalom grows ever stronger as he feeds on the ever-increasing chaos, violence and terror.

The only one who can possibly stop the horror is Glaeken, an enfeebled old warrior who has battled the Adversary across the millennia. Formerly immortal, he became a mortal man in the 1940s (during the events of The Keep) and has grown elderly. Too weak to fight alone, Glaeken gathers together a select band of people to assist him, among them a young boy with mysterious powers, a 150-year-old Indian woman with magical necklaces, a semi-catatonic scientist with a mystical connection to Rasalom, and an all-too-human vigilante named Repairman Jack.

So supremely confident is Rasalom of his eventual victory that he spares Glaeken for an especially gruesome fate and allows him to pursue his desperate plan to save the Earth so that Glaeken's ultimate failure will become both Rasalom's greatest victory as well as Glaeken's - and humankind's - most tragic final defeat.

Glaeken's only hope in defeating Rasalom and reversing the planet's descent into madness is to forge another power-sword out of the widely scattered materials that remain of his first two mystical weapons of Light. To do this he sends a two-man team to Romania to collect as many fragments of the second sword as possible. Another two-man team is dispatched to Maui to collect two very special necklaces containing material from the first power-sword ever to be created many millennia ago before Glaeken himself became the only surviving, reluctant torchbearer for the Legions of Light on this planet.

The raw materials are finally gathered together and then forged into a new power-sword by a peculiar collection of specialists hiding out in a shack on the northeastern shore of Long Island in the little hamlet of Monroe. What remains now is for the weapon to be imbued with the ancient, sentient power that resides in the young boy Jeffy and then, finally, for the power-sword itself to choose a new champion whom it deems worthy of engaging the Powers of Darkness as embodied in the evil Rasalom. Despite the expectation that the sword will choose Repairman Jack or one of the other heroes, the sword chooses the aged Glaeken, who reluctantly resumes his immortality.

Glaeken engages Rasalom in his deep, dark lair where he lies waiting for the completion of his transformation into the reigning creature of terror on Earth. For the second time in a mere 50 years the champion for the Legions of Light gets into a serious bind and only prevails in the end because of major assistance from the throngs of mere mortal humans anxiously awaiting the outcome on the surface.

1992 American novels
American thriller novels
American horror novels
New English Library books